Dhaulagiri was one of the fourteen zones which Nepal was divided into for administrative purposes, prior to the September 10, 2015 adoption of a new Constitution, which divided the nation instead into 7 provinces.  It is in the Western Development Region of Nepal and its headquarters are Baglung. Famous trekking areas like Mustang, Muktinath, Kali Gandaki valley and Mt Dhaulagiri fall in this zone. Dhorpatan Hunting Reserve, the only hunting reserve in Nepal is spread over Baglung and Myagdi Districts of this zone.

Administrative subdivisions
Dhaulagiri was divided into four districts; since 2015 these districts have been redesignated as part of Gandaki Province.

See also
 Development Regions of Nepal (Former)
 List of zones of Nepal (Former)
 List of districts of Nepal

 
Zones of Nepal
Gandaki Province
2015 disestablishments in Nepal